Frédéric Mendy (born 6 November 1981) is a Senegalese former professional footballer who played as a midfielder.

International career
Represented the national team at the 2006 Africa Cup of Nations, where his team took 4th place for the third time in history.

References

External links

Player profile - SC-Bastia.com

1981 births
Living people
Footballers from Dakar
Association football midfielders
Senegalese footballers
Senegalese expatriate footballers
Senegal international footballers
2004 African Cup of Nations players
2006 Africa Cup of Nations players
2008 Africa Cup of Nations players
AS Saint-Étienne players
SC Bastia players
Kavala F.C. players
JA Drancy players
Ligue 1 players
Ligue 2 players
Super League Greece players
Expatriate footballers in Greece
French sportspeople of Senegalese descent